Thomas Armstrong (31 October 1889 – 15 April 1963) was an Australian cricketer. He played one first-class cricket match for Victoria in 1927.

See also
 List of Victoria first-class cricketers

References

External links
 

1889 births
1963 deaths
Australian cricketers
Victoria cricketers
Cricketers from Melbourne